Flicker Records is a Christian music record label based in Franklin, Tennessee. It was founded by members of Christian rock group Audio Adrenaline. The label mainly focuses on rock/pop rock artists, though it also created a subsidiary, Big House Kids, for Christian children's music.

The label was distributed by EMI starting in 1999. Since March 24, 2006, Flicker has been a member of Provident Label Group, a subsidiary of Sony Music Entertainment.

Former artists 

 Addison Road (disbanded)
 Audio Adrenaline (active)
 Nevertheless (disbanded)
 Bleach (active)
 eleventyseven (active)
 Everyday Sunday (disbanded)
 Fireflight (active, RockFest Records)
 Kids in the Way (disbanded)
 Mortal Treason (disbanded)
 Our Heart's Hero (active, on SonyBMG/Authentik Artists)
 Pillar (band) (active, independent)
 Stereo Motion (disbanded, was originally called Phat Chance)
 Staple (disbanded)
 Subseven (disbanded)
The Swift (disbanded)

See also
 List of Christian record labels

References

External links
 

American record labels
Christian record labels
Sony Music
Rock record labels